Pichia heedii is a species of yeast in the family Saccharomycetaceae. Described in 1978, it was found growing on a dead senita cactus plant (Lophocereus schottii) in the Sonoran Desert of  Baja California, Mexico. The species was named to honor William B. Heed and his contributions to the study of desert-adapted yeasts.

References

External links 
 

Saccharomycetaceae